The cuisine of Mauritania includes the culinary practices of Mauritania. Historically, what is now Mauritania has been influenced by Arab, Berbers and African peoples who have lived in and traversed the "stark" landscape marked with Sahara desert dunes in caravans. There is an overlap with Moroccan cuisine in the north and Senegalese cuisine in the south.

French colonial influence (Mauritania was a colony until 1960) has also played a role in influencing the cuisine of the relatively isolated land. Alcohol is prohibited in the Muslim faith and its sale is largely limited to hotels. Mint tea is widely consumed and poured from height to create foam. Traditionally, meals are eaten communally.

Dishes

Traditional Mauritanian dishes include:
 Tawarikh (Dates)
 Thieboudienne (Cheb-u-jin), a coastal dish of fish and rice, is considered the national dish of Mauritania, served in a white and red sauce, usually made from tomatoes
 Méchoui, whole roasted lamb
 Samak Mutabal (Spiced fish)
 'araz Bialkhadrawat (Rice with vegetables)
 Fish balls
 Dried fish
 Dried meat 
 Couscous
 Goat stuffed with rice
 Camel (unusual) (made from Dromedaries)
 Caravane cheese
 Yassa poulet, chicken rotisserie with vegetables served over french fries or rice, originally a Senegalese dish from the Wolof and Pulaar tribes
 Mahfe, goat or camel meat in a peanut, okra and tomato sauce, served over rice and can also be made without meat (for vegetarians)
 Yassa fish
 Hakko, a sauce made from leafy vegetables served with beans over couscous
 Lakh, cheese curds or yoghurt with grated coconut served over sweet millet porridge
 Marolaym, one-pot dish of lamb or goat meat with rice in an onion base 
 Bulgur wheat with dried fruit
 Maru we-llham, meat with rice and vegetables
 Mauritanian terrine
 Camel Chubbagin, a stew
 Cherchem, Mauritanian lamb couscous
 Chubbagin Lélé et Raabie, fish stew
 Fish pastry
 Mauritanian vermicelli
 Harira, Mauritanian soup dish
 Mauritanian pepper steak with coconut
 Banaf, meat and vegetable stew
 Leksour, Mauritanian pancakes with meat and vegetable sauce
 Bonava, a lamb stew
 Al-Aïch, chicken, beans and couscous

Beverages
 Mint tea
 Zrig, milk or water mixed with fermented milk
 Baobab fruit drink (Jus de Bouye)
 Roselle drink (Bissap)
 sadza (cassava)

See also

 Arab cuisine
 List of African cuisines
 Moroccan cuisine
 Senegalese cuisine

References

External links

Mauritanian cuisine Traveling East

 
West African cuisine
Maghrebi cuisine
Arab cuisine